Macaranga tanarius is a plant found in South East Asia, Thailand, Papua New Guinea, South China, Taiwan, and eastern Australia. It is commonly seen as a pioneer species in disturbed rainforest areas. Easily recognised for the round veiny leaves. In Australia it naturally occurs from the Richmond River, New South Wales to Cooktown in tropical Queensland.

Some of the many common names include parasol leaf tree, blush macaranga, nasturtium tree, David's heart and heart leaf.

Description 

It is a shrub or bushy tree, sometimes reaching 12 metres tall and with a stem diameter of 40 cm. The trunk is short and crooked, bark being grey-brown, with bumps and irregularities. The branchlets are smooth, bluish grey with prominent leaf scars.

Leaves are alternate, and round with a tip, 8 to 23 cm long, greyish or white on the underside. It has prominent leaf stalks 8 to 20 cm long which connect within the leaf itself. Nine main veins radiate from the leaf stalk, easily noticed on the upper and lower leaf side.

Yellow-green flowers form on panicles in the months of October to January (in New South Wales). Female and male flowers grow on different trees. The fruit is a prickly three-celled yellow capsule, 9 mm in diameter, maturing in January to February (in New South Wales). There is one black seed in each of the cells. Germination from fresh seed occurs without difficulty. Cuttings strike well.

Uses
An attractive ornamental tree with interesting leaves. Also well regarded by bush regenerators to provide shade for juvenile trees.

Its bark contains tannins that are used as a colorant: it is used to dye nets, mats, as a kind of house paint, or as a leather preservative in tanning. The bark is also used as a colouring and flavouring agent for a local sugarcane rum brewed in Apayao province, Luzon.

Gallery

References

 PlantNET - The Plant Information Network System of Botanic Gardens Trust, Sydney, Australia - July 19, 2009.
http://plantnet.rbgsyd.nsw.gov.au/cgi-bin/NSWfl.pl?page=nswfl&lvl=sp&name=Macaranga~tanarius
  (other publication details, included in citation)

tanarius
Malpighiales of Australia
Flora of New South Wales
Flora of Queensland
Flora of New Guinea
Trees of Australia
Ornamental trees
Flora of Christmas Island
Plants described in 1866